WRC may refer to:

Broadcasting stations
 WRC-TV, a television station (virtual channel 4, digital channel 34) licensed to Washington, D.C., United States
 Several radio stations in the Washington, D.C. area:
 WTEM, a radio station (980 AM) licensed to Washington, D.C., United States, which used the call sign WRC from 1923 until February 1984 
 WKYS, a radio station (93.9 FM) licensed to Washington, D.C., United States, which used the call sign WRC-FM from 1947 until 1974
 WWRC, a radio station (570 AM) licensed to Bethesda, Maryland
 WQOF, a radio station (1260 AM) licensed to Washington, D.C., which used the branding "1260 WRC" from 2010 until 2014

Sports

 World Ringette Championships, international premier competition for ringette
Motor sports:
 World Rally Championship, an international car rallying competition
World Rally Car, car built to World Rally Championship specifications

Rugby clubs in England:
 Wednesbury Rugby Club
 Whitchurch Rugby Club
 Wirral Rugby Club

Video games
 WRC (video game series)
 WRC: Rally Evolved
 WRC: FIA World Rally Championship (2010 video game)

Other uses
 RAAF Woomera Range Complex, Australian military and civil aerospace facility
 War reserve constable, a rank within British police forces during World War Two
 WAVE regulatory complex, a protein complex in the WASP family of proteins
 Western Railway Corridor, Ireland
 Western Reserve College (disambiguation), two unrelated institutions in Ohio, USA
 White Ribbon Campaign, a men's movement opposing violence against women
 Will Rice College, subdivision of Rice University
 Women's Republican Council, Armenian NGO
 Worker Rights Consortium, US-based organisation protecting rights of workers making college apparel etc.
 Workplace Relations Commission, adjudication body in Ireland
 World Radiocommunication Conference, supervises usage rules for the radio-frequency spectrum and satellite orbits
 World Riichi Championship, an international competition for Japanese mahjong
 WRc, a private company, formerly Water Research Centre, UK 
 Wright Robinson College, a school in Manchester, England

See also